Municipal Corporation of Delhi (MCD) is the municipal corporation that governs most of Delhi, India. The MCD is among the largest municipal bodies in the world providing civic services to a population of about 20 million citizens in the capital city. MCD is one of three municipalities in the National Capital Territory of Delhi, the others being New Delhi Municipal Council, and Delhi Cantonment Board. The municipal corporation covers an area of 1,397.3 km² (539.5 mi²). It is the only municipality of Delhi which is elected by people.

History 

MCD came into existence on 7 April 1958 under an Act of Parliament. Prior to that DMC (Delhi Municipal Committee) was the principal civic body of Delhi. Guru Radha Kishan served for the longest consecutive period as a councilor of the MCD (initially Delhi Municipal Committee). Pt. Trilok Chand Sharma served as the first elected Mayor of Delhi.  Since then, the Municipal Body has always been alive in its constitution and functioning to the growing needs of citizens. The 1993 amendment of the Act brought about fundamental changes in composition, functions, governance and administration of the corporation.

Trifurcation
On 13 January 2012, the Municipal Corporation of Delhi was 'trifurcated', i.e. split into three smaller municipal corporations. The new North Delhi Municipal Corporation and South Delhi Municipal Corporation each contain 104 municipal wards, while the smaller East Delhi Municipal Corporation contains 64 wards.

Reunification 

In March 2022, the state Election Commission indefinitely deferred the municipal elections that were scheduled to be held in April 2022.  On 22 March, the Union Government approved the Delhi Municipal Corporation (Amendment) Bill to merge the 3 municipal corporations back to a single body. The Lok Sabha passed the Bill on 30 March 2022, while it was passed by the Rajya Sabha on 5 April 2022. The unified Municipal Corporation of Delhi formally came into existence on 22 May 2022 with IAS officers Ashwani Kumar and Gyanesh Bharti taking charge as Special Officer and Commissioner, respectively. Election was held on 4 December 2022, with Aam Aadmi Party winning the majority of seats.

MCD zones list
The entire MCD area is divided into 12 zones:

List of Mayors/ Deputy Mayors

Mayors

Deputy Mayors

Standing Committee
The Standing Committee is the highest decision making executive body of MCD and consists of 18 members. It manages the corporation with financial functions, approval to projects, discussing, finalising and implementing the policies for the capital city etc.

It also has powers to appoint sub-committees on issues such as education, environment, parking etc and form regulations.

While 6 of the Committee members are elected directly by the house, the remaining 12 are chosen by ward committes.

The committee also has a chairperson and a deputy chairperson, who are elected from among the members. The political party  which has majority in the Standing Committee has control over policy and financial decisions of the House.

Members of Standing Committee:

Kamaljeet Shehrawat (BJP)

Gajendra Daral (BJP)

Pankaj Luthra (BJP)

Mohini Jindwal (AAP)

Aamil Malik (AAP)

Ramindra Kaur (AAP)

Demographics

 India census, Delhi Municipal Corporation had a population of 11,007,835. Males constitute 55% of the population and females 45%. Delhi Municipal Corporation has an average literacy rate of 87.6%, higher than the national average of 74.0%: male literacy is 91.44% and, female literacy is 83.20%. In Delhi Municipal Corporation, 13% of the population is under 6 years of age.

Elections

2022 election

2017 election

2012 election

See also 
 List of Mayors of Delhi

References

External links
 

Municipal corporations in Delhi
1953 establishments in India
2012 disestablishments in India